The 2018–19 Hofstra Pride women's basketball team represents Hofstra University during the 2018–19 NCAA Division I women's basketball season. The Pride, led by thirteenth year head coach Krista Kilburn-Steveskey, play their home games at Hofstra Arena and are members of the Colonial Athletic Association (CAA). They finished the season 11–22, 3–15 in CAA play to finish in a tie for last place. They advanced to the quarterfinals of the CAA women's tournament where they lost to James Madison.

On March 26, Kilburn-Steveskey announced her resignation from Hofstra after 13 seasons, leaving with the program's most wins as head coach (211).

Roster

Schedule

|-
!colspan=9 style=| Non-conference regular season

|-
!colspan=9 style=| CAA regular season

|-
!colspan=9 style=| CAA Women's Tournament

See also
2018–19 Hofstra Pride men's basketball team

References

Hofstra Pride women's basketball seasons
Hofstra